Spatial rotations in three dimensions can be parametrized using both Euler angles and unit quaternions. This article explains how to convert between the two representations.  Actually this simple use of "quaternions" was first presented by Euler some seventy years earlier than Hamilton to solve the problem of magic squares.  For this reason the dynamics community commonly refers to quaternions in this application as "Euler parameters".

Definition
There are two representations of quaternions. Hamilton (where w is the first component) and JPL (where w is the last component). This article uses Hamilton for some formulas. A unit quaternion can be described as:

We can associate a quaternion with a rotation around an axis by the following expression

where α is a simple rotation angle (the value in radians of the angle of rotation) and cos(βx), cos(βy) and cos(βz) are the  "direction cosines" of the angles between the three coordinate axes and the axis of rotation. (Euler's Rotation Theorem).

Intuition
To better understand how "direction cosines" work with quaternions:

If the axis of rotation is the x-axis:

If the axis of rotation is the y-axis:

If the axis of rotation is the z-axis:

If the axis of rotation is a vector located 45° ( radians) between the x and y axes:

Therefore, the x and y axes "share" influence over the new axis of rotation.

Tait–Bryan angles

Similarly for Euler angles, we use the Tait Bryan angles (in terms of flight dynamics):
 Heading – : rotation about the Z-axis
 Pitch – : rotation about the new Y-axis
 Bank – : rotation about the new X-axis
where the X-axis points forward, Y-axis to the right and Z-axis downward. In the conversion example above the rotation occurs in the order heading, pitch, bank.

Rotation matrices 
The orthogonal matrix (post-multiplying a column vector) corresponding to a clockwise/left-handed (looking along positive axis to origin) rotation by the unit quaternion  is given by the inhomogeneous expression:

or equivalently, by the homogeneous expression:

If  is not a unit quaternion then the homogeneous form is still a scalar multiple of a rotation matrix, while the inhomogeneous form is in general no longer an orthogonal matrix. This is why in numerical work the homogeneous form is to be preferred if distortion is to be avoided.

The direction cosine matrix (from the rotated Body XYZ coordinates to the original Lab xyz coordinates for a clockwise/lefthand rotation) corresponding to a post-multiply Body 3-2-1 sequence with Euler angles (ψ, θ, φ) is given by:

Euler angles (in 3-2-1 sequence) to quaternion conversion 
By combining the quaternion representations of the Euler rotations we get for the Body 3-2-1 sequence, where the airplane first does yaw (Body-Z) turn during taxiing onto the runway, then pitches (Body-Y) during take-off, and finally rolls (Body-X) in the air.  The resulting orientation of Body 3-2-1 sequence (around the capitalized axis in the illustration of Tait–Bryan angles) is equivalent to that of lab 1-2-3 sequence (around the lower-cased axis), where the airplane is rolled first (lab-x axis), and then nosed up around the horizontal lab-y axis, and finally rotated around the vertical lab-z axis (lB = lab2Body):

Other rotation sequences use different conventions.

Source code 
Below code in C++ illustrates above conversion:

struct Quaternion
{
    double w, x, y, z;
};

Quaternion ToQuaternion(double roll, double pitch, double yaw) // roll (x), pitch (Y), yaw (z)
{
    // Abbreviations for the various angular functions

    double cr = cos(roll * 0.5);
    double sr = sin(roll * 0.5);
    double cp = cos(pitch * 0.5);
    double sp = sin(pitch * 0.5);
    double cy = cos(yaw * 0.5);
    double sy = sin(yaw * 0.5);

    Quaternion q;
    q.w = cr * cp * cy + sr * sp * sy;
    q.x = sr * cp * cy - cr * sp * sy;
    q.y = cr * sp * cy + sr * cp * sy;
    q.z = cr * cp * sy - sr * sp * cy;

    return q;
}

Quaternion to Euler angles (in 3-2-1 sequence) conversion 

A direct formula for the conversion from a quaternion to Euler angles in any of the 12 possible sequences exists. For the rest of this section, the formula for the sequence Body 3-2-1 will be shown.
If the quaternion is properly normalized, the Euler angles can be obtained from the quaternions via the relations:

However the arctan functions implemented in computer languages only produce results between −π/2 and π/2, to generate all the orientations one needs to replace the arctan functions in computer code by atan2:

Moreover, typical implementations of arctan also might have some numerical disadvantages near zero and one. Some implementations use the equivalent expression:

Source code 
The following C++ program illustrates conversion above:

#define _USE_MATH_DEFINES
#include <cmath>

struct Quaternion {
    double w, x, y, z;
};

struct EulerAngles {
    double roll, pitch, yaw;
};

// this implementation assumes normalized quaternion
// converts to Euler angles in 3-2-1 sequence
EulerAngles ToEulerAngles(Quaternion q) {
    EulerAngles angles;

    // roll (x-axis rotation)
    double sinr_cosp = 2 * (q.w * q.x + q.y * q.z);
    double cosr_cosp = 1 - 2 * (q.x * q.x + q.y * q.y);
    angles.roll = std::atan2(sinr_cosp, cosr_cosp);

    // pitch (y-axis rotation)
    double sinp = std::sqrt(1 + 2 * (q.w * q.y - q.x * q.z));
    double cosp = std::sqrt(1 - 2 * (q.w * q.y - q.x * q.z));
    angles.pitch = 2 * std::atan2(sinp, cosp) - M_PI / 2;

    // yaw (z-axis rotation)
    double siny_cosp = 2 * (q.w * q.z + q.x * q.y);
    double cosy_cosp = 1 - 2 * (q.y * q.y + q.z * q.z);
    angles.yaw = std::atan2(siny_cosp, cosy_cosp);

    return angles;
}

Singularities 
One must be aware of singularities in the Euler angle parametrization when the pitch approaches ±90° (north/south pole). These cases must be handled specially. The common name for this situation is gimbal lock.

Code to handle the singularities is derived on this site: www.euclideanspace.com

Vector rotation 

Let us define scalar  and vector  such that quaternion .

Note that the canonical way to rotate a three-dimensional vector  by a quaternion  defining an Euler rotation is via the formula

In computational implementations this requires two quaternion multiplications. An alternative approach is to apply the pair of relations

where  indicates a three-dimensional vector cross product. This involves fewer multiplications and is therefore computationally faster. Numerical tests indicate this latter approach may be up to 30%  faster than the original for vector rotation.

Proof 
The general rule for quaternion multiplication involving scalar and vector parts is given by

Using this relation one finds for  that

and upon substitution for the triple product

where anti-commutivity of cross product and  has been applied. By next exploiting the property that  is a unit quaternion so that , along with the standard vector identity 

one obtains

which upon defining  can be written in terms of scalar and vector parts as

See also

Rotation operator (vector space)
Quaternions and spatial rotation
Euler Angles
Rotation matrix
Rotation formalisms in three dimensions

References

External links 
 Q60. How do I convert Euler rotation angles to a quaternion? and related questions at The Matrix and Quaternions FAQ

Rotation in three dimensions
Euclidean symmetries
3D computer graphics
Quaternions